Stuart Kelly may refer to:

 Stuart Kelly (rugby league) (born 1976), Australian rugby league player
 Stuart Kelly (footballer) (born 1981), Scottish footballer
 Stuart Kelly (literary critic), Scottish critic and author